Vienna is a small unincorporated community located in Forsyth County, North Carolina, United States.  The community is mostly centered at Vienna-Dozier Road and Yadkinville Road.  Vienna was once incorporated in 1794 .

Lewisville annexed Vienna June 30, 2004, despite protests from many area residents. Vienna has continued to exist as a separate community.

Notes

References

Unincorporated communities in Forsyth County, North Carolina
Unincorporated communities in North Carolina
Populated places established in 1794
1794 establishments in the United States